The trigeminal cave (also known as Meckel's cave or cavum trigeminale) is a dura mater pouch containing cerebrospinal fluid.

Structure
The trigeminal cave is formed by the two layers of dura mater (endosteal and meningeal) which are part of an evagination of the cerebellar tentorium near the apex of the petrous part of the temporal bone. It envelops the trigeminal ganglion. It is bounded by the dura overlying four structures:

cerebellar tentorium superolaterally
lateral wall of the cavernous sinus superomedially
clivus medially
posterior petrous face inferolaterally

Within the dural confines of the trigeminal cave, there is a continuation of subarachnoid space along the posterior aspect of the cave, representing a continuation of the cerebral basal cisterns.

History

Etymology
It is named for Johann Friedrich Meckel, the Elder.

References

Meninges